The Financial Review Fast Starters, formerly BRW Fast Starters - is a list compiled annually of Australia's 100 fastest growing startup businesses.

The BRW Fast Starters is one list in a series of lists published by the BRW. Other lists include:

 The BRW Rich lists, including the Rich 200, Executive Rich and Young Rich lists
 The BRW Fast lists, including the Fast 100, Fast Starter and Fast Franchises lists
 The BRW Top lists, including the Top 1,000 Companies, Top 500 Private Companies and Top 50 Entertainers lists

Companies listed in BRW Fast Starters list have several things in common, including:

 They have been operating for less than four years
 They have made a turnover of at least A$500,000 in the last fiscal year
 They have higher revenue than the year previous to this
 They have fewer than 200 full-time employees
 They must have more than one main customer

Businesses that make the Fast Starters list are ranked by their revenue and by their growth percentage within the last year. The BRW Fast Starters list is released annually during May in a special issue of BRW, published by Fairfax Media. Other lists produced by BRW magazine include BRW Rich 200 and Australia's Best Places to Work.

The Fast Starters list provides a summary of figures and lists the industries growing fastest, as well as other relevant statistical data. Companies can be listed, if they have been listed in previous years, depending on turnover and growth. The Fastest growing company in 2012 is HiLife Health & Beauty - the fifth fastest growing company in last year’s list.

Lists by year

See also
 Financial Review Rich List
 Forbes Asia list of Australians by net worth

References

External links 
Financial Review Fast Starters Official List
BRW Fast Starters are Crisis-Proof. 9Finance. 2012-04-25. Retrieved 2018-07-05.
 The Knack of Looking Big for Small Business. Sydney Morning Herald. Retrieved April 30, 2012.
 The secrets of the Fast Starters. Mumbrella. 2015-10-20. Retrieved 2018-07-05.

Lists of companies of Australia
Financial Review Rich List